William Allen "Buz" Brock (born October 23, 1941) is a mathematical economist and a professor at the University of Wisconsin–Madison since 1975. He is known for his application of a branch of mathematics known as chaos theory to economic theory and econometrics.  In 1998, he was elected to the National Academy of Sciences in the Economics Section.

In a 1972 paper, co-authored with Leonard Mirman, Brock provided the first stochastic version of the neoclassical growth model, thereby paving the way for later developments such as real business cycle theory and DSGE models.

Selected publications

Papers
"Robust Control and Hot Spots in Dynamic Spatially Interconnected Systems".Brock/Xepapadeas August 15, 2010 paper
"The Emergence of Optimal Agglomeration in Dynamic Economics".Brock/Xepapadeas Oct. 16, 2009 paper
"A General Test for Nonlinear Granger Causality: Bivariate Model" Baek/Brock paper

Books
"Growth Theory, Nonlinear Dynamics and Economic Modelling: Scientific Essays of William Allen Brock". 2001

References

External links

William Allen Brock: Distinguished Fellow 2004 (bio from American Economic Association)

1941 births
Living people
Members of the United States National Academy of Sciences
20th-century American economists
21st-century American economists
University of California, Berkeley alumni
University of Missouri alumni
University of Wisconsin–Madison faculty
Fellows of the Econometric Society
Fellows of the American Academy of Arts and Sciences
Distinguished Fellows of the American Economic Association